Awara, Awaara or Aawara may refer to:

Arts and entertainment
Awaara, a 1951 Indian Hindi film
Awara (film), a 2012 Bengali film
Awara, a Telugu-dubbed version of the 2010 Tamil film Paiyaa
Awara (album), by Arjan Dhillon, 2021

People
 Darshan Singh Awara (1906–1982), Indian poet
 Sumie Awara (born 1952), Japanese athlete

Other uses
Awara (wasp), a genus of insects
Awara, Fukui, a city in Japan
Awara language, spoken in Papua New Guinea
Astrocaryum vulgare, or Awara, a spiny palm native to the Guianas and the Amazon
 Awara broth, a typical Guianan Creole stew

See also